Respiratory Care Clinics of North America (Respir. Care Clin. N. Am.) was a peer-reviewed healthcare journal published from 2000 to 2006 by Elsevier. It was indexed by PubMed/MEDLINE/Index Medicus.

External links 
 
 

Pulmonology journals
Quarterly journals
Publications established in 2000
English-language journals
Elsevier academic journals
Publications disestablished in 2006